The Brown House is a historic house on Elm Street in Bald Knob, Arkansas.  It is a single-story wood-frame structure, finished in brick, with a front-facing gable roof and a gable-roof porch that projects to the side.  The porch is supported by brick columns set on a low stuccoed wall.  The deep eaves of the roof feature knee brackets and exposed rafter ends.  Dating to the mid-1920s, it is a local example of Craftsman architecture.

The house was listed on the National Register of Historic Places in 1991.

See also
National Register of Historic Places listings in White County, Arkansas

References

Houses on the National Register of Historic Places in Arkansas
Houses completed in 1925
Houses in White County, Arkansas
National Register of Historic Places in White County, Arkansas
Buildings and structures in Bald Knob, Arkansas
1925 establishments in Arkansas
American Craftsman architecture in Arkansas
Bungalow architecture in Arkansas